John Hunter (August 4, 1778 – September 12, 1852) was an American businessman and politician from New York.

Life
He was born on August 4, 1778, the son of auctioneer Robert Hunter (–1800) and Ruth ( Breck) Hunter (–1840). He had two sisters, Elizabeth ( Hunter) Ludlow (wife of Gabriel Verplank Ludlow, nephew of George Duncan Ludlow) and Ruth ( Hunter) McEvers (wife of James McEvers, business partner of William Bayard Jr.). His father had emigrated from County Armagh in Northern Ireland to New York.

After his father's death, his mother married Lt. Gov. John Broome (under Governors Morgan Lewis and Daniel D. Tompkins) in 1806. Broome died in 1810.

Hunter graduated from Columbia College.

Career
Hunter continued his father's auctioneer and commission business before turning towards politics and selling the auction house at Pearl and Wall Streets in 1810. He was one of the original directors of the Delaware and Hudson Canal in 1823 and served as Supervisor of Westchester County before becoming a member of the New York State Senate (2nd D.) in 1823. He again served from 1836 to 1843, sitting in the 59th, 60th, 61st, 62nd, 63rd, 64th, 65th and 66th New York State Legislatures.

Hunter's Island

Sometime before 1812, he bought "Appleby's Island", which became afterwards known as Hunter's Island, located off the shore of the Town of Pelham, in Westchester County, and now part of Orchard Beach in the Bronx. Hunter built a large mansion there. Hunter was originally buried on his island estate, but was re-interred in Beechwoods Cemetery in New Rochelle after the estate was sold to Mayor Ambrose Kingsland in 1866.

Personal life

In 1799, he married Elizabeth Desbrosses (d. 1831), a daughter of Elizabeth ( Butler) Desbrosses and James Desbrosses, considered by to have been the wealthiest man in New York. Following her father's death, Elizabeth and her sister Charlotte (wife of Henry Overing) divided the 60,000 acres their father had acquired from the 2,000,000 acre Hardenburgh Patent. Before her death in February 1831, John and Elizabeth were the parents of:

 Elias Desbrosses Hunter (1800–1865), who married Anna Maria Munro, a daughter of Margaret ( White) Munro (a granddaughter of Frederick Van Cortlandt) and diplomat Peter Jay Munro of Manor Park (who was a nephew of John Jay), in 1832.

Hunter died on September 12, 1852.

Art collection

During his lifetime, Hunter amassed a substantial art collection that was considered "the nation's finest private collection of old master art." After Hunter's death and the death of his son Elias, the family gathered his "extensive collection of ancient and modern pictures removed from his gallery and residence at Hunter's Island" and offered the art for sale at an auction administered by Henry H. Leeds & Miner, Auctioneers in January 1866.

Descendants
Through his son Elias, he was a grandfather of Elias Desbrosses Hunter Jr. (who died young), Elizabeth Desbrosses Hunter (who married William Heathcote DeLancey Jr., son of Bishop William Heathcote DeLancey), Anna Maria Hunter (married Peter Jay Munro Van Cortlandt), Adele Hunter (died unmarried), and John Hunter III (1833–1914), who inherited Hunter's Island and sold it to former mayor Ambrose Kingsland in 1866 for $127,501. John Hunter III married Annie Manigault Middleton of Middleton Place, Charleston, South Carolina.

References

1778 births
1852 deaths
Democratic Party New York (state) state senators
People from Pelham, New York
Columbia College (New York) alumni